Framnaes Point is a point  southwest of Cape Saunders, on the north side of Stromness Bay, South Georgia. The name was given prior to 1920, probably by Norwegian whalers operating in the area.

The name Blenheim Rocks has appeared for these rocks, but since about 1930 the name Black Rocks has been used more consistently.

References 

Headlands of South Georgia